Gao Qiang (born 1944) is a Chinese politician and a former minister and party secretary of the Ministry of Health of the People's Republic of China.

Early life and education 
Gao is of Han ethnicity and is originally from an administrative county of Cangzhou, in Hebei province.  Gao is a graduate of Renmin University, with a degree in World economics.

Career 
Gao commenced work in 1967 and joined the Communist Party of China in 1978.  

Gao worked in a variety of economics posts within the party, including under the Ministry of Finance.  In 2001 he became the assistant secretary to the State Council of the People's Republic of China and the director of an office under it.  In 2003, Gao became the Party secretary for the Ministry of Health, and the deputy minister of its standing committee.  On April 27, 2005, he was made the acting minister of health after the departure of Wu Yi.  On June 29, 2007, a new minister was appointed, and Gao was demoted to deputy minister.  He retained his position as the ministry's Party secretary. In 2009, Gao stepped down from the Ministry of Health, but soon after was appointed deputy director of the Finance Committee and director of the budget committee of the National People's Congress.

References 

1944 births
People's Republic of China politicians from Hebei
Renmin University of China alumni
Living people
Politicians from Cangzhou
Chinese Communist Party politicians from Hebei